Wola Klasztorna ("Monastery Will") is a village in the administrative district of Gmina Sieciechów, within Kozienice County, Masovian Voivodeship, in east-central Poland. 
Former name of the village - Święcica. The current name, Wola Klasztorna probably comes from the former Benedictine Monastery in Opactwo times.

References

External links
 
 

Villages in Kozienice County